Sette giorni all'altro mondo is a 1936 Italian "white-telephones" comedy film directed by Mario Mattoli.

Cast
Camillo Pilotto
Vanna Vanni
Franco Coop
Nietta Zocchi
Emilio Petacci
Virgilio Riento
Guglielmo Barnabò
Stefano Sibaldi
Clelia Bernacchi
Flavio Díaz
Romolo Balzani
Rosina Adrario
Carlo Chertier
Carla Zaccaria

External links 
 

1936 films
Italian black-and-white films
1930s Italian-language films
1936 comedy films
Films directed by Mario Mattoli
Italian comedy films
1930s Italian films